Dischidia oiantha is an epiphytic climbing plant in the genus Dischidia native to the Philippines. The foliage of this species is elliptic and has a pendant growth habit. There is also a variety with a variegated leaf margin.

References

Dischidia
Endemic flora of the Philippines
Plants described in 1904